Polyaenus of Lampsacus (Polyainos Lampsakēnos; c. 340 – c. 285 BCE), also spelled Polyenus, was an ancient Greek mathematician and a friend of Epicurus.

Life
He was the son of Athenodorus. His friendship with Epicurus started after the latter's escape from Mytilene in 307 or 306 BC when he opened a philosophical school at Lampsacus associating himself with other citizens of the town, like Pythocles, Colotes, and Idomeneus. With these fellow citizens he moved to Athens, where they founded a school of philosophy with Epicurus as head, or hegemon, while Polyaenus, Hermarchus and Metrodorus were kathegemones.

A man of mild and friendly manners, as Philodemus refers, he adopted fully the philosophical system of his friend, and, although he had previously acquired great reputation as a mathematician, he now maintained with Epicurus the worthlessness of geometry. But the statement may be at least doubted, since it is certain Polyaenus wrote a mathematical work called Puzzles in which the validity of geometry is maintained. It was against this treatise that another Epicurean, Demetrius Lacon, wrote Unsolved questions of Polyaenus in the 2nd century BCE. Like Epicurus, a considerable number of spurious works seem to have been assigned to him; one of these was Against the Orators, whose authenticity was attacked both by Zeno of Sidon and his pupil Philodemus.

Writings
The works attributed to Polyaenus include:
On Definitions
On Philosophy
Against Aristo
Puzzles (Aporiai)
On the Moon
Against the Orators
His collected Letters.

Notes

References
Polyaenus, Polieno. Frammenti, A. Tepedino Guerra (Italian translation), Napoli, (1991)
Smith, William; Dictionary of Greek and Roman Biography and Mythology, "Polyaenus (2)", Boston, (1867)
 

340s BC births
280s BC deaths
4th-century BC Greek people
4th-century BC philosophers
4th-century BC writers
3rd-century BC Greek people
3rd-century BC philosophers
3rd-century BC writers
Ancient Greek mathematicians
Ancient Greek metaphysicians
Epicurean philosophers
Hellenistic-era philosophers from Anatolia
People from Lampsacus
4th-century BC mathematicians
3rd-century BC mathematicians